Euryopis is a genus of comb-footed spiders that was first described by Anton Menge in 1868.

Species

 it contains seventy-five species, found all over the world:
E. aeneocincta Simon, 1877 – Philippines
E. albomaculata Denis, 1951 – Egypt
E. argentea Emerton, 1882 – USA, Canada, Russia (Kamchatka)
E. bifascigera Strand, 1913 – Central Africa
E. californica Banks, 1904 – USA, Mexico
E. camis Levi, 1963 – Brazil
E. campestrata Simon, 1907 – Egypt
E. chatchikovi Ponomarev, 2005 – Russia (Europe)
E. clara Ponomarev, 2005 – Russia (Europe), Kazakhstan, Iran
E. cobreensis Levi, 1963 – Jamaica
E. coki Levi, 1954 – USA
E. cyclosisa Zhu & Song, 1997 – China
E. dentigera Simon, 1880 – France, Italy
E. deplanata Schenkel, 1936 – China
E. duodecimguttata Caporiacco, 1950 – Italy
E. elegans Keyserling, 1890 – Australia
E. elenae González, 1991 – Argentina
E. episinoides (Walckenaer, 1847) – Mediterranean to Turkey, Israel. Introduced to Reunion, India, China
E. estebani González, 1991 – Argentina
E. flavomaculata (C. L. Koch, 1836) (type) – Europe, Turkey, Caucasus, Russia (Europe to Far East), Kazakhstan, Central Asia, China, Japan
E. formosa Banks, 1908 – USA, Canada
E. funebris (Hentz, 1850) – USA, Canada
E. galeiforma Zhu, 1998 – China
E. gertschi Levi, 1951 – USA, Canada
E. giordanii Caporiacco, 1950 – Italy
E. hebraea Levy & Amitai, 1981 – Israel
E. helcra Roberts, 1983 – Seychelles (Aldabra)
E. iharai Yoshida, 1992 – Japan, Ryukyu Is.
E. jucunda Thorell, 1895 – Myanmar
E. laeta (Westring, 1861) – Europe, Tunisia, Turkey, Caucasus, Russia (Europe to South Siberia), Kazakhstan, Central Asia
E. levii Heimer, 1987 – Mongolia
E. lineatipes O. Pickard-Cambridge, 1893 – USA to Colombia
E. maga Simon, 1908 – Australia (Western Australia)
E. margaritata (L. Koch, 1867) – Spain, Italy, Croatia, Greece
E. megalops (Caporiacco, 1934) – Karakorum
E. mingyaoi Yin, 2012 – China
E. molopica Thorell, 1895 – Myanmar
E. mulaiki Levi, 1954 – USA, Mexico
E. multipunctata (Simon, 1895) – Australia (Victoria)
E. mutoloi Caporiacco, 1948 – Greece
E. nana (O. Pickard-Cambridge, 1880) – New Zealand
E. nigra Yoshida, 2000 – Japan
E. notabilis (Keyserling, 1891) – Brazil
E. nubila Simon, 1889 – India
E. octomaculata (Paik, 1995) – Korea, Japan
E. orsovensis Kulczyński, 1894 – Hungary, Turkey
E. pepini Levi, 1954 – USA
E. perpusilla Ono, 2011 – Japan
E. petricola (Hickman, 1951) – Australia (Tasmania)
E. pickardi Levi, 1963 – Jamaica, Panama to Peru
E. pilosa Miller, 1970 – Angola
E. potteri Simon, 1901 – Ethiopia
E. praemitis Simon, 1909 – Vietnam
E. promo González, 1991 – Argentina
E. quinqueguttata Thorell, 1875 – Europe, Egypt, Caucasus, Iran, Turkmenistan
E. quinquemaculata Banks, 1900 – USA
E. sagittata (O. Pickard-Cambridge, 1885) – China (Yarkand)
E. saukea Levi, 1951 – North America, Europe, Russia (Europe to Far East), Azerbaijan, Kazakhstan
E. scriptipes Banks, 1908 – USA, Mexico
E. sexalbomaculata (Lucas, 1846) – Mediterranean, Ukraine, Russia (Caucasus), Iran
E. sexmaculata Hu, 2001 – China
E. spinifera (Mello-Leitão, 1944) – Argentina
E. spinigera O. Pickard-Cambridge, 1895 – USA to Colombia
E. spiritus Levi, 1954 – USA
E. splendens (Rainbow, 1916) – Australia (New South Wales)
E. splendida (Simon, 1889) – New Caledonia
E. superba (Rainbow, 1896) – Australia (New South Wales, Victoria)
E. talaveraensis González, 1991 – Argentina
E. tavara Levi, 1954 – USA
E. texana Banks, 1908 – USA, Mexico
E. tribulata Simon, 1905 – Argentina
E. umbilicata L. Koch, 1872 – Australia
E. varis Levi, 1963 – USA
E. venutissima (Caporiacco, 1934) – Karakorum
E. weesei Levi, 1963 – USA

Formerly included:
E. dentata Gertsch & Mulaik, 1936 (Transferred to Emertonella)
E. emertoni Bryant, 1933 (Transferred to Emertonella)
E. euterpe Denis, 1954 (Transferred to Coscinida)
E. floricola Keyserling, 1886 (Transferred to Emertonella)
E. georgiana Chamberlin & Ivie, 1944 (Transferred to Emertonella)
E. inornata Chamberlin & Ivie, 1944 (Transferred to Dipoena)
E. longiventris Simon, 1905 (Transferred to Dipoena)
E. lutea Keyserling, 1891 (Transferred to Phycosoma)
E. maculata Keyserling, 1891 (Transferred to Dipoena)
E. mustelina Simon, 1888 (Transferred to Phycosoma)
E. nigripes Banks, 1929 (Transferred to Emertonella)
E. ornata Bryant, 1933 (Transferred to Stemmops)
E. orniceps Chamberlin & Ivie, 1944 (Transferred to Stemmops)
E. pumicata Keyserling, 1886 (Transferred to Dipoena)
E. pusilla Keyserling, 1886 (Transferred to Dipoena)
E. taczanowskii Keyserling, 1886 (Transferred to Emertonella)
E. tuberosa Wunderlich, 1987 (Transferred to Eurypoena)
E. variabilis Keyserling, 1886 (Transferred to Dipoena)

Nomina dubia
E. brevis (O. Pickard-Cambridge, 1871
E. gracilis (Holmberg, 1876
E. haematostigma (Blackwall, 1864
E. inscripta (O. Pickard-Cambridge, 1872
E. limbata (Walckenaer, 1841
E. modesta Schenkel, 1936

See also
 List of Theridiidae species

References

External links

Araneomorphae genera
Cosmopolitan spiders
Theridiidae